Mathulini is a town in Umzumbe Local Municipality in the KwaZulu-Natal province of South Africa.

References

Populated places in the Umzumbe Local Municipality